The 1983 Toronto Argonauts season was the 94th season for the team since the franchise's inception in 1873. The team finished in first place in the East Division with a 12–4 record and qualified for the playoffs for the second consecutive year. The Argonauts defeated the Hamilton Tiger-Cats in the Eastern Final and qualified for the Grey Cup for the second year in a row. Toronto defeated the BC Lions in the first ever Grey Cup match between the two teams, winning their 11th Grey Cup championship by a score of 18-17. The win ended a 31-year championship drought, which is the longest drought in Canadian Football League history.

During the regular season, receiver Terry Greer set a professional football record (NFL and CFL) for most receiving yards with 2003 yards. He also set a record for most 200-yard ball games in a year with three.

Preseason

Regular season

Standings

Schedule

Postseason

Grey Cup

November 27 @ BC Place Stadium (Attendance: 59,345)

Awards and honours

1983 CFL All-Stars
Terry Greer, Wide receiver
Rick Mohr, Defensive end
Carl Brazley, Defensive back

Canadian Football Hall of Fame
Condredge Holloway, quarterback (1998)
Dan Ferrone, guard (2013)
Hank Ilesic, kicker/punter (2018)
Terry Greer, wide receiver (2019)

References

Toronto Argonauts seasons
James S. Dixon Trophy championship seasons
Grey Cup championship seasons
1983 Canadian Football League season by team